Moy is a surname which may refer to:
Hendrik de Moy (1534–1610), Secretary
Mei Bo (sometimes Moy Bo), an official of the Shang Dynasty
Lexton Moy (born 1985), American soccer player of Chinese and Filipino heritage
Matthew Moy (born 1984), Chinese-American TV actor
Milagros Moy (born 1975), Peruvian volleyball player
Sylvia Moy (1938–2017), American singer and songwriter
Moy Yat (1938–2001), Wing Chun kung fu master
Moy Lin-shin (1931–1998), Taoist monk, teacher, and T'ai chi instructor

See also
Mei (surname)
Moi (name)
 Moye (name)
 Moy (disambiguation)